Udine is a city and comune in north-eastern Italy, in the middle of the Friuli Venezia Giulia region, between the Adriatic Sea and the Alps (Alpi Carniche). Its population was 100,514 in 2012, 176,000 with the urban area.

Names and etymology

Udine was first attested in medieval Latin records as Udene in 983 and as Utinum around the year 1000. The origin of the name Udine is unclear. It has been tentatively suggested that the name may be of pre-Roman origin, connected with the Indo-European root *odh- 'udder' used in a figurative sense to mean 'hill'. The Slovene name Videm (with final -m) is a hypercorrection of the local Slovene name Vidan (with final -n), based on settlements named Videm in Slovenia. The Slovene linguist Pavle Merkù characterized the Slovene form Videm as an "idiotic 19th-century hypercorrection."

History 
Udine is the historical capital of Friuli. The area has been inhabited since the Neolithic age, and is believed to have been settled by Illyrians.

Based on an old Hungarian legend, Attila (?–453), the leader of the Huns, built a hill there, when besieging Aquileia, because he needed a winter quarters billet: he instructed his soldiers to bring soil in their helmets and shields, because the landscape was too flat, without any hill. He established the town there, and built a square-shape tower.

After the fall of the Western Roman Empire, the area increased in importance after the decline of Aquileia, then further after the decline of Cividale. In AD 983 Udine was mentioned for the first time, with the donation of the Utinum castle by emperor Otto II to the Patriarchs of Aquileia, then the main feudal lords of the region. In 1223, with the foundation of the market, the city became finally the most important in the area for economy and trade, and also became the Patriarch's seat.

In 1420, it was conquered by the Republic of Venice. In 1511, it was the seat of a short civil war, which was followed by an earthquake and a plague. Udine remained under Venetian control until 1797, being the second largest city in the state. After the short French domination which ensued, it was part of the Austrian-puppet Lombardy-Venetia Kingdom, and was included in the newly formed Kingdom of Italy in 1866.

During World War I, from May 1915 to October 1917, Udine became the seat of the Italian High Command and was nicknamed "Capitale della Guerra" ("War Capital"). After the battle of Caporetto, it was occupied by the Germans in late 1917 and by the Austro-Hungarians in 1918 until after the Battle of Vittorio Veneto in 1918. After the war it was made capital of a short-lived province (Provincia del Friuli) which included the current provinces of Gorizia, Pordenone and Udine. After September 8, 1943, when Italy surrendered to the Allies in World War II, the city was under direct German administration, which ceased in April 1945.

Geography

Climate 
Udine has a humid subtropical climate (Köppen: Cfa). Precipitation is abundant all year round with spring and fall being the wettest seasons.

Demographics 

In 2007, there were 97,880 people residing in Udine itself (whereas the greater area has a population double its size), located in the province of Udine, Friuli Venezia Giulia, of whom 46.9% were male and 53.1% were female. Minors (children ages 18 and younger) totalled 14.36% of the population; in comparison, to pensioners accounted for 24.27%. This contrasts with the Italian average of 18.06% (minors) and 19.94% (pensioners). The average age of Udine residents is 47 compared to the Italian average of 42. Between 2002 and 2007, the population of Udine grew by 1.48%, whereas Italy as a whole grew by 3.56%. The current birth rate of Udine is 9.13 births per 1,000 inhabitants compared to the Italian average of 9.45 births.

The nearby area close to the border has a Slovene population estimated at about 2,000. A 1475 document mentions Slovene as the language of the "lower class" in the town, and the Udine Manuscript of 1458 contains Slovene vocabulary. Alasia da Sommaripa's Italian–Slovenian dictionary was printed in Udine in 1607. However, the Slovenian minority is not officially recognized by the municipality, and Slovene is not taught in any city's state educational institution, nor in neighboring municipalities. Udine, on the other hand, is one of the municipalities in Friuli where Friulian is taught.

, 90.90% of the population was of Italian descent. The largest immigrant group came from other European nations (particularly Albania and Romania), at 5.37%, followed by sub-Saharan Africa (mostly from Ghana), 1.65%, and North Africa, 0.77%.

Government

Main sights 

The old residence of the patriarchs of Aquileia, the palazzo Patriarcale, was erected by Giovanni Fontana in 1517 in place of the older one destroyed by an earthquake in 1511. Under the Austrians it was used as a prison. A recension of the Visigothic code of laws, called the Breviary of Alaric, was formerly preserved In the cathedral archives, in a manuscript known as the Codex Utinensis, which was printed before it was lost.

In the 1550s, Andrea Palladio erected some buildings in Udine. The Oratorio della Purità has 18th-century frescoes by Giambattista Tiepolo and his son Giandomenico.

The church dedicated to St. Mary of the Castle is probably the oldest in Udine, judging from extant fragments dating back to the Lombard era. It lost its parish status in 1263, when it was annexed to the larger parish of Saint'Odorico (now the cathedral). It has been renovated many times over the centuries: the façade, for example, was entirely rebuilt after the 1511 Idrija earthquake. Its three naves preserve the suggestive atmosphere of silence and contemplation, which is often found in old churches. The Venetian Governor, Tommaso Lippomano, commissioned the Venetian Gothic portico with steps and ramps leading down the hill in 1487.

In the principal square (Piazza della Libertà) stands the town hall (Loggia del Lionello) built in 1448–1457 in the Venetian-Gothic style opposite a clock tower (Torre dell'Orologio) resembling that of the Piazza San Marco at Venice. It was begun in 1448 on a project by Nicolò Lionello, a local goldsmith, and was rebuilt following a fire in 1876. The new design was projected by the architect Andrea Scala.

Opposite the Loggia del Lionello is the Loggia di San Giovanni, a Renaissance structure designed by Bernardino da Morcote. Other noteworthy monuments in the square are the Fountain by Giovanni Carrara, an architect from Bergamo (1542); the Columns bearing the Venetian Lion and the Statue of Justice (1614), the statues of Hercules and Cacus and the Statue of Peace (1819) which was donated to Udine by Emperor Francis I to commemorate the peace Treaty of Campoformido.

The Cathedral of Udine is an imposing edifice whose construction started in 1236, on a Latin cross-shaped plan with three naves and chapels along the sides. The church was consecrated in 1335 as Santa Maria Maggiore. At the beginning of the 18th century a radical transformation project involving both the exterior and the interior was undertaken at the request and expense of the Manin family. The Baroque interior has monumental dimensions and contains many works of art by Tiepolo, Amalteo, and Ludovico Dorigny. On the ground floor of the bell tower (built from 1441 over the ancient baptistry) is a chapel which is completely adorned with frescoes by Vitale da Bologna (1349).

The centre of Udine is dominated by the castle, built by the Venetians from 1517 over a Lombard fortification ruined by an earthquake in 1511. The current Renaissance appearance dates from the intervention of Giovanni da Udine, who finished the works starting from 1547. The castle houses one of the most ancient Parliament Halls of Europe.

Other points of interest 
 Orto Botanico Friulano, a botanical garden
 Parco Botanico Friulano "Cormor", a park and botanical garden
 Tempio Ossario dei Caduti d'Italia, 1931 church

Culture 
Udine has a university, the University of Udine. The archbishop's palace and the Museo Civico have quite important paintings. The city has a theater, the Teatro Giovanni da Udine.

Important festivals include the wine-and-food September festival, Friuli D.O.C., the national literary prize for non-fiction Premio Friuli Storia and the biggest European festival of popular East Asian cinema, the Far East Film Festival, in April.

Asteroid 33100 Udine was named in honour of the city.

Along with Italian, Friulian is often spoken in Udine, as well as a variant of Venetian (called Venetin) that is however in decline.

Museums

 Civici musei e gallerie di storia e arte (since 1906) with Museo Archeologico, Galleria d'Arte Antica, Galleria dei Disegni e delle Stampa, Museo Friulano della Fotografia, Fototeca e Collezioni Risorgimentali
 Museo di Arte Moderna e Contemporanea
 Museo etnografico del Friuli (Palazzo Giacomelli)
 Gallerie del Progetto
 Museo del Duomo di Udine
 Museo diocesano e gallerie del Tiepolo

Economy 
Udine is important for commerce, with several commercial centers in the hinterland. There are also iron and mechanical industries (Danieli and ABS are the most important).

Transport
With 7,600,000 travelling people every year, Udine railway station is the most important station in Friuli Venezia Giulia. Train services operate to Venice, Treviso, Trieste, Gemona del Friuli, Tarvisio, Cividale del Friuli, Padua, Bologna, Rome, Verona and Milan. International trains operate to Vienna and Munich.

Gallery

Sport 
 
The main football club in the city is Udinese Calcio, founded in 1896, who, as of 2021, have played in every Serie A season since the 1995–96 season. Their ground, the Stadio Friuli, was a venue at the 1990 FIFA World Cup.

The local basketball team, APU GSA, played in the second national league, the LegaDue.

Notable people 

 Luigi De Agostini (born 1961), footballer
 Afro Basaldella (1912–1976), painter
 Giuseppe Battiston (born 1968), actor
 Enzo Bearzot, (1927–2010), national football trainer
 Mario Benedetti, (1955–2020), poet
 Girolamo di Bernardino, 16th-century painter of frescoes
 Bernardino Blaceo, 16th-century painter
 Emanuele Blandamura (born 1979), boxer
 Sebastiano Bombelli (1635-1719), Baroque and Rococò painter
 José Bragato, (1915–2017), cellist and composer
 Carlo Caneva (1845–1922), major general
 Eliana Cargnelutti (born 1989), blues rock musician.
 Luca Carlevarijs, (1663–1730), painter
 Elena Cecchini (born 1992), cyclist
 Davide Cecotti (born 1973), professional football player
 Andrea Centazzo (born 1948), drummer and composer
 Bruno Chizzo (1916–1969), footballer
 Giovanni da Udine, (1487–1564), painter (Renaissance)
 Raimondo D'Aronco, (1857–1932), architect
 Mario David (1934–2005), football player and coach.
 Alfredo Foni (1911–1985), football player and coach.
 Fabio Frittelli, (1966–2013), better known by his pseudonym Mo-Do, an Italian musician
 Massimo Giacomini, (born 1939), former footballer and sports commentator
 Andrea Chiopris Gori, (born 1977), former footballer
 Francesco Janich (1937–2019), footballer
 Dalila Di Lazzaro (born 1953), actress and model
 Ernesto Lomasti, (1959–1979), mountaineer
 Guido Macor, (born 1932), retired footballer
 Fabio Masotti (born 1974), cyclist
 Alberto Mazzucato (1813–1877), composer and music teacher
 Tina Modotti (1896–1942), photographer, actress, revolutionary
 Francesco Pavona (1695–1777), Baroque painter
 Daniele Petri (born 1980), Italian darts player
 Nicola Pezzetta (born 1963), artist and architect
 Luigi Pio Tessitori, (1887–1919), indologist, linguist
 Alessandro Piu (born 1996), footballer
 Bruno Pizzul, (born 1938), sports journalist and footballer
 Bruno Sacco (born 1933), car designer
 Alessia Tuttino (born 1983), footballer
 Elena Valentinis (1396–1458), Roman Catholic Blessed professed religious
 Glauco Venier (born 1962), jazz pianist and composer
 Giuseppe Virgili (1935–2016), Italian footballer (striker)
 Alessandro Zanni, (born 1984), rugby union player

International relations

Twin towns – sister cities
Udine is twinned with:

 Albacete, Spain
 Esslingen am Neckar, Germany
 Maribor, Slovenia
 Neath Port Talbot, Wales, United Kingdom

 Schiedam, Netherlands
 Vienne, France
 Villach, Austria
 Windsor, Canada
 Yaoundé, Cameroon

Friendship

 Bikaner, India
 Klagenfurt, Austria
 Óbuda-Békásmegyer, Hungary
 Piotrków Trybunalski, Poland
 Resistencia, Argentina
 Velenje, Slovenia

See also 
Friuli innovazione

References

Further reading

External links 

 Udine homepage
 Udine on Italia.it
 Udine, Italy: a cultural guide by Sunday Telegraph

 
983 establishments
Udine
10th-century establishments in Italy
Domini di Terraferma